Madeline is an unincorporated area in Lassen County, California. Its population is 21 as of the 2020 census.

A post office was operated at Madeline from 1875 to 1878, and from 1879 to 1882. It was reopened in 1887, and moved in 1902. The zip code for the town is 96119.

Madeline was formerly a stop on the now-abandoned Nevada-California-Oregon Railway, later taken over by the Southern Pacific Railroad.

Climate
This region experiences warm (but not hot) and dry summers, with no average monthly temperatures above 71.6 °F.  According to the Köppen Climate Classification system, Madeline has a warm-summer Mediterranean climate, abbreviated "Csb" on climate maps.

References

Unincorporated communities in California
Unincorporated communities in Lassen County, California